Issam Amira is a Palestinian Islamic scholar, preacher, Khatib and Imam at Al-Rahman Mosque in Beit Safafa and Al-Aqsa Mosque. He is also one of the prominent figures of Hizb ut-Tahrir.

In November 2018 Sheikh Issam was arrested from Sur Baher and imposed ban for the second time from Al-Aqsa Mosque by Israeli police for the period of six months for praising the Muslim boy who beheaded Samuel Paty. He was also banned for two weeks two years ago.

References

Living people
Palestinian imams
21st-century imams
Hizb ut-Tahrir
Palestinian Sunni Muslims
Year of birth missing (living people)